Noh Haeng-Seok (born 17 November 1988) is a South Korean footballer who plays as a defender for Busan IPark in the K League Classic. He joined Gwangju in 2011. He joined Busan IPark at the start of the 2015 season.

Club career statistics

References

External links 

1988 births
Living people
Association football defenders
South Korean footballers
Gwangju FC players
Daegu FC players
Busan IPark players
K League 1 players
K League 2 players
Dongguk University alumni